Getter Saar (born 6 June 1992) is an Estonian badminton player, currently residing in Finland. She started playing badminton at the age of ten, and made a debut in the international tournament in 2007. As a single player she was the third on the pedestal at the Estonian Championships in 2010, 2011, 2013 and 2015. Besides that, in 2010 and 2011 she was the Estonian junior champion in the women's singles, and in 2011 in the mixed doubles. Saar was a semi finalist in 2015 Riga International and the runner-up in 2019 Bulgarian International.

Achievements

BWF International Challenge/Series 
Women's singles

  BWF International Challenge tournament
  BWF International Series tournament
  BWF Future Series tournament

References

External links 
 

Living people
1992 births
Estonian female badminton players
Sportspeople from Kuressaare
Estonian expatriate sportspeople in Finland